Narantaka (Sanskrit: नरान्तक, IAST: narāntaka, lit. destroyer of men) and Devanataka (Sanskrit: देवान्तक, IAST: devāntaka, lit. destroyer of Gods) are asuras and sons of Ravana who appear in a number of Hindu legends. They, along with Atikaya, were the offspring of Ravana and his second wife Dhanyamalini. In the battle of Ramayana, Narantaka was killed by Angada, the son of Bali, whereas Devantaka was slaughtered by the punch of Hanuman in a duel. 
Rakshasa in the Ramayana
Asura

References